Rogers High School is a public high school located in Rogers, Minnesota, United States, and is part of the Elk River School District 728.

Athletics
From 2019 - 2022, Rogers High School Boys Hockey Team made it to the 5AA Section Championship all three years. Maple Grove HS has shut them down all three years. Rogers HS has a bright future in hockey.

Through the 201819 school year, Rogers High School competed in the Mississippi 8 Conference, consisting of other central Minnesota schools (Big Lake, Buffalo, Cambridge-Isanti, Chisago Lakes, Monticello, North Branch, Princeton, St. Francis, and St. Michael-Albertville).

Since the 20192020 school year, Rogers has competed in the Northwest Suburban Conference, which includes Andover, Anoka, Blaine, Centennial, Champlin Park, Coon Rapids, Elk River, Maple Grove, Osseo, Park Center, Robbinsdale Armstrong, Spring Lake Park, and Totino-Grace.

In 2021 the Rogers High School Football team made it to the state semifinals in the Minnesota State High School League class 5A playoffs.

Former Rogers High School alum Nick Jensen is a member of the Washington Capitals of the National Hockey League.

20102011
Notable events in 20102011 included girls soccer winning the State Tournament and Mississippi 8 Conference title with an undefeated season. Football advanced to the State Tournament for the second consecutive year and claimed their second consecutive Mississippi 8 Conference title following an undefeated regular season. Boys soccer won their first Mississippi 8 Conference title.

20092010
Notable events in 20092010 included the Rogers Football Team advancing to the State Tournament for the first time in school history. Girls soccer won the Class A State Tournament.

References

External links
 

Public high schools in Minnesota
Educational institutions established in 2003
Schools in Hennepin County, Minnesota
2003 establishments in Minnesota